Kisses and Hugs is a 1999 Italian comedy film written and directed by Paolo Virzì.

Cast 

Francesco Paolantoni as Mario Mataluna
 Massimo Gambacciani as Renato Bacci
 Daniela Morozzi as Ivana Bacci
Paola Tiziana Cruciani as Tatiana Falorni
 Isabella Cecchi as Annalisa Brodolini
 Pietro Gremigni as Luciano Cecconi
 Emanuele Barresi as Ennio
 Edoardo Gabbriellini as Alessio Bacci

References

External links

1999 films
1990s Christmas comedy films
1990s Italian-language films
Films directed by Paolo Virzì
Italian Christmas comedy films
1990s Italian films